Constantia may refer to:

Places and jurisdictions 
 in Europe
 Constanța or Constantia (in Scythia) (Κωνστάντια), Ancient Tomis, capital of (the Romanian part of) Dobruja region by the Black Sea
 the former Diocese of Constantia in Scythia, now a Latin Catholic titular see
 Salamis, Cyprus, renamed Constantia in the 4th century, also Salamina (Italian), former seat of a Metropolitan archbishopric, now double (Latin Catholic and Cypriot Orthodox) titular see
 Coutances, France
 Konstanz, Germany

 in Asia 
 Constantia, Lucknow, in Lucknow, India, built as the residence of Claude Martin
 Constantia (Osrhoene), now in Asian Turkey

 elsewhere
 Constantia (town), New York, United States
 Constantia (CDP), New York, a subdivision of Constantia, New York
 Constantia, Cape Town, South Africa

Biology 
 Constantia (plant), an orchid genus
 Constantia (gastropod) a genus of sea snails in the family Vanikoridae

Other 
 Constantia (wine), a South African wine
 Constantia (typeface), a typeface introduced as part of Windows Vista
 Chevrolet Constantia, an automobile marketed in South Africa from 1969 to 1978
 , one of several ships of that name